Kevin D. Prufer (born 1969 in Cleveland, Ohio) is an American poet, academic, editor, and essayist. His most recent books are How He Loved Them (Four Way Books, 2018),Churches (Four Way Books, 2014), In A Beautiful Country (Four Way Books, 2011) and National Anthem (Four Way Books, 2008).

Life
Prufer graduated from Western Reserve Academy in 1988. He received a B.A. at Wesleyan University and an M.A. at the Hollins University Writing Program. He went on to earn an MFA at Washington University in St. Louis. He is currently Professor of English in the Creative Writing Program at the University of Houston and Editor-at-Large of Pleiades: A Journal of New Writing, Associate Editor of American Book Review, Co-Curator of the Unsung Masters Series, and the former Vice President/Secretary of the National Book Critics Circle. Prufer currently resides in Houston, Texas with artist and critic Mary Hallab.  He is Professor of English in the Creative Writing Program at the University of Houston.

Career
He has published poems, essays, and reviews  in literary journals and magazines including The Paris Review, American Poetry Review, Poetry, A Public Space, AGNI, The New Republic, The Kenyon Review, Boston Review, Georgia Review,  and in The Best American Poetry (2003 & 2009).

His honors include four Pushcart Prizes, and awards from the Poetry Society of America, the Academy of American Poets, The Lannan Foundation and other organizations. His first book, Strange Wood, received the 1997 Lena-Miles Wever Todd Poetry Prize (formerly the Winthrop Prize). He has also been awarded a 2007 National Endowment for the Arts Literature Fellowship in Poetry.

Kevin is a featured faculty member at the 2018 Conference on Poetry at The Frost Place in Franconia, NH.

Published works
Full-Length Poetry Collections
 The Art of Fiction (Four Way Books, 2021)
 How He Loved Them (Four Way Books, 2018)
 Churches (Four Way Books, 2014)
 In A Beautiful Country (Four Way Books, 2011)
 National Anthem (Four Way Books, 2008)
 Fallen from a Chariot (Carnegie Mellon University Press, 2005)
 The Finger Bone (Carnegie Mellon University Press, 2002)
 Strange Wood (Louisiana State University Press, 1998)

Anthologies Edited
 Into English: Poems, Translations, Commentaries (Graywolf Press, 2017, with Martha Collins)
 Literary Publishing in the 21st Century (Milkweed Editions, 2016, with Wayne Miller and Travis Kurowski)
 Catherine Breese Davis: On the Life and Work of an American Master (Unsung Masters Series, 2015, with Martha Collins and Martin Rock)
 Russell Atkins: On the Life and Work of an American Master (Unsung Masters Series, 2013, with Michael Dumanis)
 Until Everything is Continuous Again: On the Work of W. S. Merwin (WordFarm, 2012, with Jonathan Weinert)
 Dunstan Thompson: On the Life & Work of a Lost American Master (Pleiades Press, 2010, with D. A. Powell)
 New European Poets (Graywolf Press, 2008, with Wayne Miller)
 Dark Horses: Poets on Overlooked Poems (University of Illinois Press, 2007, with Joy Katz)
 The New Young American Poets (Southern Illinois University Press, 2000)

Poetry Collections In Translation
 Himno Nacional (Bartleby Editores, 2021) (Spanish translation by multiple translators)
 Wir wollten Amerika finden (Luxbooks, 2011) (German translation by Norbert Lange and Susanna Mewe)

Honors and awards

 2019 Long-list, the Pulitzer Prize for poetry
 2019 Winner, The Julie Suk Award for the best poetry book from the American literary press
 2019 Finalist, The Rilke Prize for the best book by a mid-career American poet
 2018 Lyric Prize of the Poetry Society of America
 2016 Pushcart Prize
 2014 The New York Times "Ten Favorite Poetry Books of 2014" for Churches
 2013 Finalist, The Poets Prize
 2012 Academy of American Poets Notable Book
 2011 Finalist, The Rilke Prize
 Best American Poetry 2010
 2010 Lannan Foundation Fellowship
 Best American Poetry 2009
 2009 Finalist, The Poets Prize
 2007 National Endowment for the Arts Literature Fellowship in Poetry
 2007 Pushcart Prize
 2006 George Bogin Memorial Award
 2004 George Bogin Memorial Award
 2004 Pushcart Prize
 Best American Poetry 2003
 2002 Pushcart Prize
 1997 Lena-Miles Wever Todd Poetry Prize

References

External links
 Kevin Prufer's personal website
 Kevin Prufer's faculty page at the University of Houston
 Poems by Kevin Prufer
 Pleiades: A Journal of New Writing

1969 births
University of Houston faculty
American male poets
Living people
Writers from Cleveland
Print editors
Wesleyan University alumni
Washington University in St. Louis alumni
Poets from Ohio
Poets from Missouri
National Endowment for the Arts Fellows
Western Reserve Academy alumni